Cause of death may refer to:

Cause of death, a term typically used on official reports
List of causes of death by rate, a list of causes of death by rate
List of preventable causes of death, a list of preventable causes of death by rate
Cause of Death (novel), a 1996 crime fiction novel by Patricia Cornwell
Cause of Death (album), a 1990 album by Obituary
Cause of Death, a 2000 film by Shimon Dotan
Cause of Death (video game), 2010 video game
"The Cause of Death", a song by Immortal Technique from Revolutionary Vol. 2

See also
 Death#Causes of human death